The Flag of Split is the vexillological symbol of the city of Split in Croatia. The flag is blue, with the emblem of the city in silver. The emblem consists of the walls of Diocletian's Palace, and the bell tower of Saint Domnius Cathedral behind them. Variations of this device have been in use for centuries. In particular, the design of the bell tower has changed. The traditional colours of Split are white (for the city) and blue (for the sea).

A variant of the modern commemorative flag, celebrating the 1700-year anniversary of the construction of Diocletian's Palace, is also in common use. This flag is also blue, with a shade gradient from darker to lighter from bottom to top, with the white emblem of the city in the lower half, consisting of six words "SPLIT" forming the silhouette of the walls of Diocletian's Palace and the bell tower of the Saint Domnius Cathedral, topped with a cross.

See also
Coat of arms of Split
Split
Flag of Dalmatia

References 

Split
Split
Split